Michael Toby Edward Peirce (born 14 June 1973) is a retired cricketer who played first-class cricket for Sussex County Cricket Club.

He was educated at Ardingly College, and went on to play 69 times for Sussex between 1994 and 2000.

References

External links

1973 births
English cricketers
Sussex cricketers
People educated at Ardingly College
Living people
British Universities cricketers
Alumni of Durham University